The Women's artistic team all-around competition at the 2018 Asian Games will be held on 21 August 2018 at the Jakarta International Expo Hall D2.

Schedule
All times are Western Indonesia Time (UTC+07:00)

Results
Legend
DNF — Did not finish
DNS — Did not start

References

External links
 Results

Artistic Women's individual all-around